Bisauli is a town and a municipal board in Badaun district  in the state of Uttar Pradesh, India. It is settled on Badaun - Moradabad Highway. Bisauli is known for its temples and mosques abounding the town. Bisauli is a constituency of District Budaun. Member of Legislative Assembly from Bisuli is Ashutosh Maurya of Samajwadi Party

Demographics
 India census, Bisauli had a population of 32,780; 16.990 were male and 15,790 were female, giving a sex ratio of 929.  Bisauli had an average literacy rate of 63.13%, lower than the state average of 67.68%; male literacy was 69.17% and female literacy was 56.65%. 14.08% of the population was under 6 years of age.

References

Cities and towns in Budaun district
Blocks in Budaun District